The Jacalitos Hills are a low mountain range in western Fresno County, central California.

They are in the Southern Inner California Coast Ranges. Habitats of the hills are in the California interior chaparral and woodlands sub-ecoregion.

Jacalitos is derived from a Spanish word meaning "little wigwams".

References

External links

California Coast Ranges
Mountain ranges of Northern California
Mountain ranges of Fresno County, California